William Henderson McIntyre (1881 –  26 October 1949) was a member of the New Zealand Legislative Council from 2 September 1921 to 1 September 1928; 2 September 1928 to 2 September 1935; 2 September 1935 to 1 September 1942; 10 September 1942 to 9 September 1949; 16 September 1949 to 26 October 1949, when he died. McIntyre was first appointed by the Reform Government, and finally by the First Labour Government.

He served on several boards, including: the Buller Hospital Board for 33 years including 20 years as chairman; the Nelson Education Board for 31 years including 19 years as chairman; and the Westport Harbour Board from 1918 to 1921. He was elected to the Buller County Council in 1915 and was its chairman for four years.

A Scottish-born coal miner, McIntyre arrived in New Zealand in 1904, and took an active role in mining union affairs. With his brother he set a record for the coal mined in one shift at the Millerton Mine.

In 1935, McIntyre was awarded the King George V Silver Jubilee Medal. He died on 26 October 1949, and was buried at Orowaiti Cemetery, Westport.

References

1881 births
1949 deaths
Members of the New Zealand Legislative Council
Reform Party (New Zealand) MLCs
People from the West Coast, New Zealand
Local politicians in New Zealand
Scottish emigrants to New Zealand